Clivina karikali is a species of ground beetle in the subfamily Scaritinae. It was described by Jedlicka in 1964.

References

karikali
Beetles described in 1964